The Vengeful Beauty (血芙蓉) is a 1978 Shaw Brothers film directed by Meng Hua Ho, starring Lo Lieh, Chen Ping and .

Plot

As the trained Flying Guillotine assassins secretly working for the Emperor begin their attacks, one of the assassins (Yuen Cheung-yan) is caught by local security forces. Flying Guillotine leader Jin Gang-feng (Lo Lieh) is ordered to kill every witness including the prison interrogator and his family to keep the assassins a secret. Rong Qiu-yan (Chen Ping) returns home to find her dead husband and immediately fingers Gang-feng. With her superior kung fu, she nearly kills him, but retreats to protect her unborn child. Now Gang-feng is in deep trouble. He's told the Emperor under threat of execution that all witnesses are dead. In order to keep his head, Gang-feng turns to his three adult children to quickly hunt down and kill Qiu-yan who is now attempting to reach her uncle. As the hunt begins, Qiu-yan hooks up with a former Flying Guillotine member named Ma Seng (Norman Chu) and her old martial brother Wang-jun (Yueh Hua) who both help her along the way and become rivals in their love for her.

Cast
Norman Chui
Chen Ping
Wang Lung Wei
Lo Lieh
Yueh Hua

External links
 

Kung fu films
Hong Kong martial arts films
Shaw Brothers Studio films
Films set in 18th-century Qing dynasty
1970s Hong Kong films